Visitant is the sixth studio album by American extreme metal band Arsis, released on November 2, 2018, via Nuclear Blast (in Americas) and Agonia (in Europe and the rest of the world). It was the last to feature lead guitarist Brandon Ellis before his resignation to join The Black Dahlia Murder.

Track listing

Personnel
Arsis
 James Malone – lead vocals, rhythm guitar
 Brandon Ellis – lead guitar, backing vocals
 Noah Martin – bass, backing vocals
 Shawn Priest – drums, backing vocals

Additional musician
 Malcolm Pugh  – guitar solo 
 Trevor Strnad  – guest vocals 
 Ben Bennett – backing vocals
 Torin Ridgway – backing vocals

Production
 Mark Lewis – production, recording, mixing, mastering
 James Malone – recording 
 Brandon Ellis – recording 
 Noah Martin – recording 
 Mark Riddick – artwork, layout

References

2018 albums
Arsis albums
Nuclear Blast albums
Albums produced by Mark Lewis (music producer)